Everybody Says I'm Fine! is an Indian English language drama film, released on 12 September 2001 at the Toronto Film Festival. It marks the directorial debut of Indian actor Rahul Bose and the screen debut for actor Boman Irani. For his work on Everybody Says I'm Fine! Bose won the runner-up John Schlesinger Award for best directorial debut at the 2003 Palm Springs International Film Festival.

Plot 
The film revolves around a small group of elite Mumbaikars whose lives converge at a hairdresser's salon. The protagonist Xen (Rehaan Engineer) owns the salon and has a unique gift of connecting with the minds of his clients and reading their thoughts while at work. Most of his customers maintain a facade of normality in order to gain semblance and hide their tumultuous lives to some extent.

As backdrop to Xen's ability, it is revealed that as a young boy, he witnessed the death of his parents in a freak accident at a recording studio, where nobody could hear his cries for help through the sound-proof booth as he saw the flames rising. Ever since, Xen's life  plunged into some sort of forced silence. Xen uses his gift to help most of his clients, notably Tanya (Pooja Bhatt), whose private life is being indecently probed into by another one of his customers, Misha (Anahita Oberoi). Xen manages to get the dirt on Misha, who is a secret cocaine addict, and more unsavory details surface where it comes to knowledge that Misha has even gotten some children at the orphanage she works at addicted to it. Xen slips the information to Tanya without her knowledge, who then confronts Misha with it when Misha becomes a little too inquisitive in Tanya's personal affairs.

Xen is however, clueless in his own silence, and to add to it, he is unable to probe into the mind of one of his customers, Nikki/Nikita (Koel Purie) who arrives in his saloon one day and asks him to cut off all her long hair. He begins to develop feelings for her, sensing some form of distress in her being, unable to reach her but somehow wanting to help.

Later, as Xen serves one of his regulars, a respectable businessman, Mr. Mittal (Boman Irani), it transpires that the married Mr. Mittal is busy planning a liaison with another woman. More facts slowly unfold to reveal Mr Mittal is, in fact, Nikki's father, and Nikki has been subjected to an incestuous relationship. Enraged, on gradually learning the truth straight from the thoughts of his client, Xen strikes a heavy blow to Mr. Mittal's head, killing him, and later disposing of the body.

The death of her father triggers in Nikki a sudden response, and she crumbles to the ground in Xen's arms. He is now engulfed in  her disconcerting train of thoughts, disjointed, and echoing her torment of many years. The final scene of the film shows Xen waking the next morning to find the silence in his life is now beyond him, and he can hear, as clearly and wholly as the next human being. Nikki embraces him; the mutual catharsis has made them both more wholesome beings.

Cast

Crew 
 Director: Rahul Bose
 Writing Credits: Rahul Bose

Soundtrack

The film's soundtrack was composed by tabla player Zakir Hussain. Released by Universal, it was the first Indian soundtrack to feature Carlos Santana.

References

External links

Everybody Says I'm Fine at Bollywood Hungama

English-language Indian films
2001 films
Films shot in India
2001 directorial debut films
Indian drama films
Films about child sexual abuse
Films about telepathy
2000s English-language films